Mladen Plakalović (born 25 September 1991 in Sarajevo) is a cross-country skier from Bosnia and Herzegovina who has competed since 2007. He finished 78th in the 15 km event at the 2010 Winter Olympics in Vancouver.

Plakalović finished 115th in the individual sprint event at the FIS Nordic World Ski Championships 2009 in Liberec.

His lone win was in 15 km event at Bosnia and Herzegovina in 2009.

References

External links

1991 births
Living people
Bosnia and Herzegovina male cross-country skiers
Cross-country skiers at the 2010 Winter Olympics
Cross-country skiers at the 2014 Winter Olympics
Cross-country skiers at the 2018 Winter Olympics
Olympic cross-country skiers of Bosnia and Herzegovina
Sportspeople from Sarajevo
Serbs of Bosnia and Herzegovina